Temminck's flying squirrel (Petinomys setosus) is a species of rodent in the family Sciuridae. It is found in Indonesia, Malaysia, Myanmar, and Thailand.

References

Thorington, R. W. Jr. and R. S. Hoffman. 2005. Family Sciuridae. pp. 754–818 in Mammal Species of the World a Taxonomic and Geographic Reference. D. E. Wilson and D. M. Reeder eds. Johns Hopkins University Press, Baltimore.

Petinomys
Rodents of Malaysia
Rodents of Indonesia
Rodents of Myanmar
Rodents of Thailand
Mammals described in 1844
Taxonomy articles created by Polbot